José Miguel González may refer to:
Míchel (footballer, born 1963) (José Miguel González Martín), Spanish retired footballer
Josemi (José Miguel González Rey, born 1979), Spanish footballer